Ali ibn Sulayman al-Hashimi, known as al-Hashimi, was an Islamic 
 astronomer and mathematician, who flourished during the late 9th century.

Biography
No details of the 9th century Islamic astronomer Ali ibn Sulayman al-Hashimi's life are recorded, but he flourished in 890. As well as his work as an astronomer, he contributed to the development of irrational numbers.

It is a discussion of the astronomical ideas of the Greeks, Indians and Persians, which characterized Islamic astronomy before the arrival of the Ptolemaic tradition, and includes the basic theories underlying , chronology, planetary cycles and equations, eclipses, timekeeping, and astrology. 

The work lacks an organized structure or any critical comments about other astronomers, and is prone to technical errors made by al-Hashimi, as well as mistakes by later copyists. It may have been copied by scribes in Damascus in 1288.

 is extant in a unique manuscript now preserved at Oxford University (MS. Arch. Selden. A.11). The work has no innovative ideas, is historically important, as it cites 14 works by other astronomers, most of which are lost, and so provides information about the history of science. It has been translated by Fuad I. Haddad and Edward Stewart Kennedy.

Notes

References

Sources

Further reading

External links
 Record of the manuscript held at the Bodlean Library, Oxford
 Further information about Pingree and Kennedy's translation of The Book of the Reasons Behind Astronomical Tables

Astronomers of the medieval Islamic world
9th-century people from the Abbasid Caliphate
9th-century scholars
9th-century astronomers
9th-century Arabs